Giovanna Campiolo Rocha (born 14 June 1996) is a Brazilian professional footballer who plays as a central defender for Corinthians and the Brazil women's national team.

Club career
Campiolo was born in Guaratinguetá, São Paulo, and began his career with Taubaté's youth setup. She later moved to Portuguesa, and played for brief periods at Foz Cataratas and Kindermann/Avaí.

In 2018, Campiolo moved to Corinthians.

International career
After representing Brazil at under-20 side, Campiolo received her first call-up for the full side in March 2022.

Honours

Club
Corinthians
Campeonato Brasileiro de Futebol Feminino Série A1: 2018, 2020, 2021
Campeonato Paulista de Futebol Feminino: 2019, 2020, 2021
Copa Libertadores Femenina: 2019, 2021

References

1996 births
Living people
Footballers from São Paulo (state)
Brazilian women's footballers
Women's association football defenders
Campeonato Brasileiro de Futebol Feminino Série A1 players
Sport Club Corinthians Paulista (women) players